Elelea multipunctata is a species of beetle in the family Cerambycidae. It was described by Heller in 1923. It inhabits the island of Borneo.

References

Mesosini
Beetles described in 1923